The Ringstead Coral Bed (also sometimes in the plural) is a geological formation with fossilized coral in England. It preserves fossils dating back to the Jurassic period. The beds are exposed at Ringstead Bay in Dorset, on the Jurassic Coast, hence the name.

See also

 List of fossiliferous stratigraphic units in England
 Jurassic Coast
 Ringstead Bay

References

Further reading
 

Jurassic England
Jurassic Coast
Geology of Dorset